Abdul Jeleel Ajagun (born 10 February 1993) is a  Nigerian football attacking midfielder.

Club career
Ajagun is a youth product of the Nigerian's Dolphins F.C.

On 28 August 2013, Panathinaikos announced Ajagun signed a contract for four years with the club. On his debut with Panathinaikos, he scored against Platanias.

On 30 July 2015, Ajagun helped Greek club Panathinaikos come from behind to beat visiting Club Brugge of Belgium 2–1 in a UEFA Champions League qualifying round. Panathinaikos fell behind in front of their fans after just 10 minutes, but they showed great character to come back and win with two goals one in each half. And that was after they had defender Sergio Sanchez sent off two minutes from halftime and also missed a penalty in the 34th minute. Ajagun was replaced in the 46th minute on account of the red card against his team.
Former Nigeria youth star Abduljeleel Ajagun scored for his Greek side Panathinaikos in his first league game of the 2015–16 season as they beat Levadiakos 3–0. On 29 January 2015, Panathinaikos announced that 23-year-old Nigerian midfielder Abdul Ajagun will continue his career at Levadiakos on loan until the end of season. Ajagun was not in manager's Andrea Stramaccioni plans and his departure will free a foreigner's position, in order for the Greens to complete Lucas Villafanez and Rodrigo Moledo's transfers.

On 14 July 2016, Roda have announced the signing of former Nigeria youth international on season-long loan with a view to a permanent move. Ajagun, who played under the Miners boss Yannis Anastasiou will be hoping to make his mark in the Dutch elite division. On 15 April 2017, he scored a brace in a vital game against Sparta Rotterdam sealing a 3–1 home win in his club's effort to avoid relegation. On 7 May 2017, he scored at the last minute of the vital home game against Willem II sealing a 1–0 win but despite the win, the team from Kerkrade kept fighting Sparta Rotterdam and NEC for a chance to direct self-preservation, with one game remaining for the end of the season.

On 5 July 2017, Ajagun moved to Kortrijk on coach Yannis Anastasiou's recommendation, as Panathinaikos announced officially. It has long been known to be official, that the Nigerian footballer was not in the plans of Panathinaikos coach Marinos Ouzounidis after returning from his long season loan to Roda. On 17 September 2017, he scored his first goal with the club in a 2–2 home draw against Anderlecht.

Career statistics

International career
He was a member of the Nigeria national under-17 football team that placed second in the 2009 edition they hosted, and scored two goals.
He has played in two African Youth Championships with the Nigeria under-20 team. He captained the squad in 2013 as they placed third to qualify for the 2013 Under-20 World Cup in Turkey.

On 21 June 2013, Ajagun scored two goals in their 3–2 defeat to Portugal in their opening game of the 2013 U-20 World Cup.

Honours

Club
Dolphins
Nigeria Premier League: 2010–11

Panathinaikos
Superleague Greece: Runner-up: 2013–14, 2014–15
Greek Cup: 2013–14

Country
Under-20
African Youth Championship: 2011; Third Place: 2013

References

External links
 

1993 births
Living people
Yoruba sportspeople
Sportspeople from Lagos
Nigerian footballers
Super League Greece players
Dolphin F.C. (Nigeria) players
Panathinaikos F.C. players
Levadiakos F.C. players
Eredivisie players
Roda JC Kerkrade players
K.V. Kortrijk players
Belgian Pro League players
2013 African U-20 Championship players
Nigeria under-20 international footballers
Nigerian expatriate footballers
Expatriate footballers in Belgium
Expatriate footballers in Greece
Expatriate footballers in the Netherlands
Nigerian expatriate sportspeople in Belgium
Nigerian expatriate sportspeople in Greece
Nigerian expatriate sportspeople in England
Association football midfielders
Cape Town City F.C. (2016) players
Al-Hilal Club (Omdurman) players
Expatriate soccer players in South Africa
Expatriate footballers in Sudan